João Nuno Duarte Viana (born 13 January 1992) is a Portuguese professional footballer who plays for Swiss club FC Stade Nyonnais as a right back.

Football career
Born in Maia, Porto District, Viana played for three clubs as a youth, including Boavista F.C. where he had several spells. In 2011–12 he made his senior debuts with C.D. Trofense, in the Segunda Liga.

Viana appeared in his first professional game on 7 August 2011, starting against F.C. Penafiel in the season's League Cup.

References

External links
 
Portuguese League profile 

1992 births
Living people
People from Maia, Portugal
Portuguese footballers
Association football defenders
Liga Portugal 2 players
Segunda Divisão players
Boavista F.C. players
C.D. Trofense players
C.D. Feirense players
Leixões S.C. players
Portugal youth international footballers
Portuguese expatriate footballers
Expatriate footballers in Switzerland
Sportspeople from Porto District